An aircraft category is defined by the International Civil Aviation Organization as "a classification of aircraft according to specified basic characteristics", for the purpose of personnel licensing. Examples of aircraft categories include aeroplanes, helicopters, gliders, or free balloons.

United States of America

In the United States of America, there are seven aircraft categories for the purpose of certification of aircraft pilots:

 Airplanes
 Rotorcraft such as helicopters
 Powered lift
 Gliders
 Lighter than air
 Powered parachute
 Weight-shift control

Aircraft categories are also defined with respect to the certification of aircraft, to mean "a grouping of aircraft based upon intended use or operating limitations." Examples include transport, normal, utility, acrobatic, limited, restricted, and provisional.

EASA

In EASA states, "Category of aircraft" means a categorisation of aircraft according to specified basic characteristics. Examples include aeroplane, powered-lift, helicopter, airship, sailplane, and free balloon.

See also
Aircraft approach category

References

Aviation
Aircraft categories